Unity of Heaven and humanity is an ancient Chinese philosophical concept that is found common across all Chinese religions and philosophies. The basic idea is that societal phenomena such as physiology, ethics, and politics of humanity are direct reflections of Tian, "heaven" or "nature."

History 
The idea finds its origins in ancient Chinese religion, in which humans were possessed by spirits and in a trance. This early shamanistic experience can still be found in forms of present-day Chinese folk religion. The notion was discussed as early as the Spring and Autumn Warring States period, but was later elaborated within Confucianism, Daoism, and Buddhism.

Confucianism 
It was cited by Dong Zhongshu in the Han Dynasty as heaven and mankind induction, and by Cheng-Zhu school of Neo-Confucianism is derived from the theory of the Divine Principle.

Daoism 
In Daoism, Tian or "Heaven" is nature, and humanity is a part of nature, as the saying goes: "If there is man, there is also heaven; if there is heaven, there is also heaven. "Heaven and earth are born with me, and all things are one with me" (Zhuangzi).

Chinese medicine 
The traditional Chinese medicine text Huangdi Neijing advocates the unity of Heaven and humanity. Huangdi Neijing emphasizes that man "corresponds to heaven and earth, is in harmony with the four seasons, and that man participates in heaven and earth" (Lingshu - Pricking the Joints of True Evil), that "man participates with heaven and earth" (Lingshu - The Dew of the Year, Lingshu - Jing Shui), and that "he is as one with heaven and earth" (Suwen - The Essence of Pulse). It is believed that "heaven", as an objective existence independent of human spiritual consciousness, and "man", as a subject with spiritual consciousness, have a unified origin, properties, structure and laws.

Outside Chinese thought 
In the Western world, the idea of "unity of God and humanity" in Ancient Greece, Christianity, and Islam is also similar to the Chinese idea of "unity of Heaven and humanity," but there are still some differences in nature. In ancient Greece, the "unity of God and humanity" could only be achieved by a sorcerer with special powers; whereas Christianity believes that anyone who confesses his sins and accepts the salvation of God's only Son, Jesus Christ, is given authority by Jesus to become a child of God and enter eternal life. The Islamic view emphasizes the "good works" that believers are to observe.

In Indian culture, the main theme of the great classic Upanishads is Unity of Brahman (Moksha), which is a tenet practiced by deep yogis and coincides with the Chinese idea of the unity of heaven and man.

See Also 
 
 Unity of ritual and government
 Pavilion of Harmony
 Microcosm–macrocosm analogy

References

Further reading 
 
 天人合一 （页面存档备份，存于）  （《中華百科全書》）
 季羨林：〈「天人合一」新解〉 （页面存档备份，存于）（2008）
 哲學概念淺釋第四輯：「天人合德」與「神人合一」 （页面存档备份，存于）
 陆庆祥：“天人合一”思想之我观
 中西人文精神與宗教精神的交會
 道家養生要旨簡述
 淺析回族宗教學者劉智“神人合一”的認識論—— 中文伊斯蘭學術城 （页面存档备份，存于）
 科學人雜誌 （页面存档备份，存于）
 唐君毅 《與青年談中國文化》（節錄一）

Chinese philosophy
Religious Confucianism
Relationship between Heaven and Mankind
Religion in China
Taoism